Oinofyta (Greek: Οινόφυτα) is a village and former municipality in eastern Boeotia, Greece. Following the local government reform of 2011, it is now part of the municipality of Tanagra, of which it is a municipal unit. The municipal unit has an area of 77.273 km2, the community 18.643 km2. 
It was formerly named Staniates (Στανιάτες) until 1927.
Within the territory of the municipal unit lies the ancient town of Oenophyta, where the Battle of Oenophyta was fought in 457 BCE.

Subdivisions
The municipal unit of Oinofyta is subdivided into the following communities (constituent villages in brackets):
Agios Thomas
Kleidi
Oinofyta (Oinofyta, Dilesi)

Historical population

Oinofyta has historically been an Arvanite settlement.

Pollution
In December 2007, official tests revealed that drinking water in Oinofyta was contaminated with high levels of the carcinogen hexavalent chromium, which is used as an anti-corrosive in the production of stainless steel, paint, ink, plastics and dyes. For decades, factories had been dumping waste in the Asopos River, whose waters run from red to black and ripple with bubbling sludge.

Peaple
Archbishop Ieronymos II was born in the settlment.

Transport
The Village is served by a railway station on the edge of the village with Proastiakos trains to Athens.

Sport
G.S. Oinophyta Olympiad, football
G.S. Oinophyton, basketball

See also
List of settlements in Boeotia

References

External links
Municipality of Oinofyta
Local Department of Agios Thomas

Populated places in Boeotia
Arvanite settlements